FK Timočanin is a football club based in Knjaževac, Serbia. They compete in the Serbian League East, the third tier of the national league system.

History
After winning the Pomoravlje-Timok Zone League in the 2012–13 season, the club was promoted to the Serbian League East. They subsequently placed 10th in the 2013–14 campaign. After spending three seasons in the third tier of Serbian football, the club finished second from the bottom in the 2015–16 Serbian League East and suffered relegation to the Zone League East.

The club returned to the Serbian League East after winning the Zone League East in 2019. They marked their 100th anniversary in December 2021.

Honours
Pomoravlje-Timok Zone League / Zone League East (Tier 4)
 2012–13 / 2018–19

Notable players
For a list of all FK Timočanin players with a Wikipedia article, see :Category:FK Timočanin players.

Managerial history

References

External links
 Club page at Srbijasport

1921 establishments in Serbia
Association football clubs established in 1921
Football clubs in Serbia